Leicester Malcolm Rutledge  (born 12 April 1952) is a former New Zealand rugby union player. A flanker, Rutledge represented Southland at a provincial level, and was a member of the New Zealand national side, the All Blacks, from 1978 to 1980. He played 31 matches for the All Blacks including 13 internationals, and captained the side in one match, against Combined Services on the 1978 tour of Britain and Ireland.

In the 2022 New Year Honours, Rutledge was appointed a Member of the New Zealand Order of Merit, for services to rugby and the community.

References

1952 births
Living people
Rugby union players from Christchurch
People educated at Riccarton High School
New Zealand rugby union players
New Zealand international rugby union players
Southland rugby union players
Rugby union flankers
Members of the New Zealand Order of Merit